The Battle of Kozludzha (also known as the Battle of Kozluca), fought on 20 June (Old Style - June 9) 1774 near the village of Kozludzha (now Suvorovo, Bulgaria), was one of the final and decisive battles of the Russo-Turkish War (1768–1774). The Russians managed to rout the Ottoman army, scoring a major victory. This battle, alongside several others in this campaign, established the reputation of the Russian general Alexander Suvorov as one of the brilliant commanders of his time.

The Ottoman forces are estimated at about 40,000. Russian numbers were much lower, 8,000 men in total. The Ottoman forces were demoralized due to previous defeats and had poor logistics (including a year of withheld back pay).

Battle
The Russian army under Generals Alexander Suvorov and Mikhail Kamensky encountered the Ottoman forces of General Abdul-Rezak Pasha. After scouts reported to Suvorov, he immediately ordered the attack. The Russian army, divided into four squares, attacked the Ottomans. Ottoman cavalry charges were repulsed by the Russians,  while a Russian cavalry attack from the rear resulted in the capture of all of the Ottoman artillery. Russian artillery fire is also said to have been highly devastating to the Ottoman forces. Casualties were 3,000 for the Ottomans and 209 for the Russians. The Russians captured the Ottoman camp with its supplies, while the Ottomans abandoned Kozludzha and retreated to Shumla, where they were soon blockaded, suffering from further defeats and attrition.

Aftermath
The Russian victory was one of the major reasons why a month later, on 21 July, the Ottomans were forced to sign the unfavorable Treaty of Küçük Kaynarca.

References

 
Kozludzha
Kozludzha
Kozludzha
1774 in the Ottoman Empire
18th century in Bulgaria
Russo-Turkish War (1768–1774)
Alexander Suvorov